Soul Searching is an album by organist Shirley Scott for the Prestige label which was recorded in 1959.

Reception
The Allmusic review stated "Soul Searching spotlights Shirley Scott's accelerated development as a composer... each song is a model of energy and efficiency as tight as an outgrown pair of shoes".

Track listing 
All compositions by Shirley Scott except as indicated
 "Duck and Rock"- 5:35   
 "Gee, Baby, Ain't I Good to You" (Don Redman, Andy Razaf) - 4:50   
 "Yes Indeed" (Sy Oliver) - 5:53   
 "Boss" – 4:32   
 "Moanin'" (Bobby Timmons) - 5:35   
 "Plunk, Plunk, Plunk" - 4:33   
 "You Won't Let Me Go" (Buddy Johnson) - 4:32   
 "Soul Searchin'" - 4:30

Personnel 
 Shirley Scott - organ
 Wendell Marshall - bass
 Arthur Edgehill - drums

References 

1960 albums
Albums produced by Esmond Edwards
Albums recorded at Van Gelder Studio
Prestige Records albums
Shirley Scott albums